The 2019 America East Conference women's basketball tournament began on March 6 and concluded with the championship game on March 15. Maine won the championship game over Hartford to earn the automatic bid to the NCAA Division I women's basketball tournament.

Seeds
Teams are seeded by record within the conference, with a tiebreaker system to seed teams with identical conference records.

Schedule
All tournament games are nationally televised on an ESPN network:

Bracket and Results
Teams are reseeded after each round with highest remaining seeds receiving home court advantage.

All times listed are Eastern

See also
 2019 America East men's basketball tournament

References

External links
 2019 America East Women's Basketball Championship

Tournament
America East Conference women's basketball tournament